The Marsabit clawed frog (Xenopus borealis) is a species of frog in the family Pipidae found in Kenya, Tanzania, and possibly Uganda. Its natural habitats are subtropical or tropical high-altitude grassland, rivers, freshwater lakes, intermittent freshwater lakes, freshwater marshes, intermittent freshwater marshes, pastureland, and ponds.

Distribution
The Marsabit clawed frog is only found in the upper elevations of the East African montane moorlands eco-region, and in the East African montane forests eco-region of south-eastern Africa.

References

Xenopus
Amphibians described in 1936
Taxonomy articles created by Polbot